Marek Antoni Bajor (born 10 January 1970 in Kolbuszowa) is a former Polish footballer and manager. He is known for working as a coach of Zagłębie Lubin from 2009 to 2011.

Career

Club
Bajor's career started in the 1988–89 season with Igloopol Kolbuszowa, before playing for Igloopol Dębica and Widzew Łódź. In 1997-98 he moved to Amica Wronki. He retired in 2002.

National team
He represented his native country at the 1992 Summer Olympics in Barcelona, where he won the silver medal.

External links
 

1970 births
Living people
Polish footballers
Widzew Łódź players
Amica Wronki players
Olympic footballers of Poland
Olympic silver medalists for Poland
Footballers at the 1992 Summer Olympics
Polish football managers
Zagłębie Lubin managers
Olympic medalists in football
People from Kolbuszowa
Sportspeople from Podkarpackie Voivodeship
Medalists at the 1992 Summer Olympics
Association football defenders